Bonalu( Telugu: బోనాలు) is a traditional Hindu festival centered on the Goddess Mahakali from Telangana. This festival is celebrated annually in the twin cities of Hyderabad and Secunderabad, as well as in other parts of the state. It is celebrated in the month of Ashada Masam, which is around July and/or August. Special "poojas" (worship/ ceremonies) are performed for Yellamma (one of the many regional forms of Mahakali) on the first and last day of the festival. The festival is also considered a thanksgiving to the Goddess for fulfillment of vows.

The word Bonam is a contraction of the word Bhojanam, a Sanskrit loanword which means a meal or a feast in Telugu. It is an offering to the Mother Goddess. Women prepare rice cooked with milk and jaggery in a new brass or earthen pot adorned with neem leaves, turmeric, vermilion and a lit lamp on top of the pot. Women carry the pots on their heads and make an offering of the Bonam along with turmeric-vermilion, bangles and sari to the Mother Goddess across the temples.

Bonalu involves the worship of Mother Goddess in regional forms like Maisamma, Pochamma, Yellamma, Peddhamma, Dokkalamma, Ankalamma, Poleramma, Maremma, Nookalamma.

Origin of Bonalu festival
The origin of this festival can be traced back to the 18th century in the erstwhile Hyderabad State, and is linked with the "Regimental Bazaar" and the twin cities of Hyderabad and Secunderabad. In the year 1813, plague broke out in the twin cities, and this took the lives of thousands of people. Just before this, a military battalion from Hyderabad was deployed to Ujjain. When this military battalion from Hyderabad got to know about the epidemic in the twin cities, they prayed to the Mother Goddess in Mahakali Temple – Ujjain, Madhya Pradesh. The battalion supposedly prayed to Goddess Mahakali to kill the plague, and if the goddess did so, they would install an idol of the Goddess Mahakali in the city. It is believed that Mahkali destroyed the disease and kept the pestilence away. Then, the battalion returned to the city and installed an idol of the goddess, which was followed by the offering of Bonalu to her. This then became a tradition that has been followed by most of the people of Telangana.

There are also other versions regarding the origin of the festival. This include the mythological story that this is the time when Goddess Mahakali comes back to her parental home, during Ashada Maasam or the period from late June to August, which makes this period the most optimal time to offer Bonalu to the goddess. This practice is comparable to the treatment meted to a married daughter who returns to her parents' home each year for a vacation and is pampered by her parents.

The Ritual

Bonalu is celebrated in various parts of the twin cities. In Hyderabad, on the first Sunday of Aashadham, celebrations are held at the Jagadamba temple at Golconda Fort. On the second Sunday, at Balkampet Yellamma temple in Balkampet and Ujjaini Mahakali Temple , and Gandimaisamma Temple in Regimental Bazar in Secunderabad, and on the third Sunday, at the Pochamma and Katta Maisamma temple of Chilkalguda and the Matheswari temple of Lal Darwaza in the Old City of Hyderabad. Akkanna Madanna temple in Haribowli, and Muthyalamma temple in Shah Ali Banda are among other temples where Bonalu is celebrated. Every year, lakhs of devotees congregate to pay obeisance to Mahakali.

On this special occasion, women dress up in the traditional Sari, jewels and other accessories. Teenage girls wear half Saris/Lehenga Choli, and ornaments to bring out the traditional grace of the attire. Some Tranced women dance with balancing pots (Bonam), to the rhythmic beats of drums in honour of the local goddess. To ward off evil spirits, in olden days, people used to sacrifice a male buffalo in front of the temple, but now it is replaced with the sacrifice of roosters.

Women carrying Bonalu are believed to possess the spirit of Mother Goddess, and when they go towards the temple, people pour water on their feet to pacify the spirit, who is believed to be aggressive.

Every group of devotees offer a Thottelu (a small colorful, paper structure supported by sticks), as a mark of respect to the goddess.

The Bonalu celebrations at "Lashkar" Secunderabad is one of the most prominent Bonalu celebrations. The festival begins on the first Sunday of the Hindu Month of Ashada which is known as Edurukolu, which is celebrated as the homecoming of the goddess in the form of Ghatam. On the third Sunday of the Ashada month, Bonalu Jatara is celebrated, and on the following Monday, Rangam (Oracle) and Ghatam Saganamputa are celebrated, when the festivities come to an end.

The prominent temples in the Secunderabad "Lashkar Bonalu" include Sri Ujjaini Mahakali Devasthanam, Sri Gandimaissamma Temple, Sri Devi Pochamma Temple, Sri Muthyalamma Temple, Sri Peddamma Temple, Sri Dokkalamma Temple, Sri Muthyalamma Temple, and Sri Peenugula Mallanna Temple, among others. Out of these temples, Sri Ujjaini Mahakali Temple, and Sri Devi Pochamma Temple are government temples, government officials and legislators also visit and take part in the festivities.

Certain areas like Gunfoundry, and Kalasiguda celebrate Bonalu in the Sravanam month, unlike other parts of the city which celebrates in the month of Ashadam. Gunfoundry Muthyalamma Temple is the one temple which has an almost two-century-old tradition. The tradition consists of two days festivals, with the first day of the festival with Bonam given to deities from various devotees, known as the Thotela procession, followed by the Ghatam procession, and concluding with Ori (village) Bonam by the trustees on behalf the devotees. On the second day, events like Rangam, Kallu Ghatam, Sare Gampa procession, and Gavurangam (Potharaju) take place, concluding the event by sending off the Ghatam procession.

Pothuraju

According to mythology, Potharaju the brother of the Mother Goddess. His role is played in the procession by a well-built, bare-bodied man, wearing a small tightly draped red dhoti, bells on his ankles, and anointed with turmeric on his body and vermilion on his forehead. He dances to resounding drums in the procession.

Potharaju always dances in front of the Palaharam Bandi, i.e., the procession. He is considered the initiator of the festivities and the protector of the community. He leads the female dancers who are under the spell of the Mother Goddess (known as shigam) to the temple, with lashing whips and emerald neem leaves (margosa) tied around their waists, accompanied by trumpets and drums.

The Feast
Bonalu is a festival of offering to the Mother Goddess, and families share the offering with family members and guests. A non-vegetarian family feast follows after the great offering. The meat used to prepare the meal is the meat of a goat or a rooster, that has been ceremonially slaughtered, and later partaken as a meal. Peasants take whatever food they can as a display of affection to the earth goddess and eat it later. Toddy (palm wine) workers also offer toddy which they tap for their livelihood. There is no special scriptural mandate on what has to be offered. As per tradition, offerings are made to the goddess which consists of toddy, along with fowls, sheep and goat. Animals killed for community meals are not considered sacrifices. There are no scriptural books that prescribe the peasant-tradition, that the Mother Goddess demands meat as an offering. The tradition of this peasant festival is similar to the Islamic Bakrid tradition, where a goat is slaughtered and consumed. Western and Brahmin literature confuses animals consumed in festival time for communal meals in peasant tradition with the sacrifices of Rig Vedic Brahmins, where animals were killed by fire priests, not for consumption but for ritual reasons. However, with the advent of modernization and government control over peasant traditions, people have been restricted to only use pumpkins, bottle gourds, coconuts and lemons.

The festive environment is quite palpable in the locality celebrating the festival, with loud-speakers playing folk songs and such other songs in respect of the Mother Goddess, and the streets decorated with neem leaves.

Rangam

Rangam (or Performing the Oracle), is held the next morning of the festival. A woman standing atop of an earthen pot invokes Goddess Mahakali onto her and performs the custom. She foretells the year ahead for the devotees asking about the future. This takes place before the procession is started. The present oracle at Sri Ujjaini Mahakali Devasthanam and other major temples of Secunderabad is Kumari Erupula Swarnalatha, who is currently the 6th generation oracle. Previous oracles include Kumari's elder sister Kum, Swaroopa before her, her grandmother Bagamma and other ancestors including Jogamma and Poshamma.

Ghatam

Ghatam is a copper pot, decorated in the form of the Mother Goddess. The Ghatam is carried by a priest, who wears a traditional Dhoti, and whose body is smeared with turmeric. The Ghatam is taken into procession from the first day of the festival until the last day when it is immersed in water. The Ghatam is usually accompanied by beating of drums.

The festival concludes with immersion of the Ghatam. The Ghatam of Haribowli's Akkanna Madanna Temple leads the procession, placed atop an elephant and accompanied by mounted horses and models depicting Akkanna and Madanna. It ends in the evening with a glittering procession and display of much pomp and show followed by immersion of Ghatams at Nayapul.

The festival has a carnival-like atmosphere, where thousands of people wait along the main streets of Laldarwaza to Nayapul and watch the exquisitely and elaborately decorated Ghatams. Young men dance in a unique style to the drum beats and folk songs alongside Pothuraju, and dress-up in various mythological roles. The Ghatams of the Secunderabad City (Lashkar) include Ujjaini Mahakali & Mahadevi Pochamma at Karbala Maidan, Dokkalamma at Himam Bavi, Muthyalamma at Kalasiguda, Nallagutta, Pan Bazar, Chilkalguda, Uppara Basthi, Kummariguda, Regimental Bazar and Bhoiguda, etc.
 
Areas in Secunderabad that existed from the British Colonial era have their own dates for celebrating Bonalu in their villages like Mudfort, Gunrock, and Sikh Village. They celebrate the Ghatam procession for one or two days, depending on their traditions. Thiru thulkanthamman Temple in Old Mudfort has been celebrating Ghatam for about 100 years. The Ghatams of the Old City procession include the Mahankali temples in Haribowli Akkanna-Madanna, Lal Darwaza, Uppuguda, Miralam Mandi and Kasaratta, the Jagadamba temple of Sultanshahi, Bangaru Mysamma temple of Shah Ali Banda, Alijah Kotla and Gowlipura, and Sultanshahi, Darbar Mysamma of Aliabad, Mysamma Temple of Boggulkunta  and Mutyalamma temple of Chandulal Bela.

Certain areas like Gunfoundry and Kalasiguda celebrate Bonalu in the Sravanam month, unlike other parts of the city that celebrates in the month of Ashadam. In Gunfoundry Muthyalamma Temple, there is a two-century-old tradition, where there are two days festivities with the traditional rituals.

Thottela

Another part of the  Bonalu festival is Thottela, whereby an artifact is offered to the goddess by the people of Telangana. This artifact (called Thottela) is made of bamboo sticks and colorful transparent papers.

Gallery

References

External links

 Women carrying the Bonam
 
 Mayadari Mysamma song feature on The

Hindu festivals
Festivals in Hyderabad, India
June observances 
July observances
August observances
Religious festivals in India
Festivals in Telangana